Pingshui Town is an urban town in Chaling County, Zhuzhou City, Hunan Province, People's Republic of China.

Cityscape
The town is divided into 19 villages and 1 community, the following areas: Pingshui Community, Huangshi Village, Longzhouxin Village, Baji Village, Shuiyuan Village, Fengxian Village, Shijiang Village, Sanmen Village, Hedong Village, Maoping Village, Jinshan Village, Qiujia Village, Shizhu Village, Longxin Village, Shibaotou Village, Erxian Village, Wufeng Village, Xiping Village, Huangnitang Village, and Xiaoshui Village.

References

External links

Divisions of Chaling County